The Thunder Bay Bombers were a Canadian Senior ice hockey team from Thunder Bay, Ontario.  They played an independent schedule under the supervision of Hockey Northwestern Ontario.  They were 2005 Allan Cup Canadian National Champions.

History
The Twins were founded in 2003.  A year later, under different management, they changed their name to the Bombers.  The name Bombers was inspired by the hockey movie Youngblood and colours by that then worn by the San Jose Sharks.

In 2005, after shocking Major League Hockey's Aylmer Blues 2-games-to-none to win the Ontario seed and Renwick Cup, the Bombers went out to Lloydminster and captured the 2005 Allan Cup.  This marked the first Allan Cup championship by an Ontario team since 1989 by the original Thunder Bay Twins.

The Bombers spent much of the 2005-06 season touring Europe as representatives of Hockey Canada, only to get quickly ejected from the playoffs by the Eastern Ontario Senior Hockey League's Whitby Dunlops.  In Europe, they competed in a tournament for the Pannon GSM Cup in Budapest, Hungary.  After tying the Croatia National Team 1-1, they lost 6-1 to the Slovenia National Team and 6-4 to the Hungary National Team.  The team went home with an 0-2-1 record and the tournament's Bronze Medal.  Losing a lot of money from the European trip, the teams suspended operations for the 2006-07 season, opening the door for a new regional team to take their playoff spot, the Kenora Thistles.

2005 Allan Cup run

Winning roster

Goalies:
Cory McEachran
Scott Sutton
Defence:
Barry McKinlay
Mike Jacobsen
Matt Kenny
Jeff Ricciardi
Tyler Williamson
Albert Drake
Ed Atwill

Head Coach - Vern Ray

Assistant Coach - Dave Joubert

General Manager - Albert Drake

Equipment Manager - Rob Monty

Forwards:
Mike Figliomeni
Jeff Adduono
Joe Ritson
Robert Hillier
Craig Preistlay
Derek Levanen
Bob MacPhail
Neal Purdon
Kevin Hoogsteen
Steve Dumonski
Sean McEachran
Tyler Bruno
Omer Belisle
Trevor Abraham
Steve L'Ecuyer
Carl Racki

External links
Hockey Thunder Bay

Hockey Northwestern Ontario
Senior ice hockey teams
2003 establishments in Ontario
2006 disestablishments in Ontario
Ice hockey clubs established in 2003
Ice hockey clubs disestablished in 2006
Ice hockey teams in Ontario